The 1954 Volta a Catalunya was the 34th edition of the Volta a Catalunya cycle race and was held from 5 September to 12 September 1954. The race started in Montjuïc and finished in Barcelona. The race was won by Walter Serena.

General classification

References

1954
Volta
1954 in Spanish road cycling
September 1954 sports events in Europe